Vriesea arachnoidea is a plant species in the genus Vriesea, endemic to Brazil.

References

arachnoidea
Flora of Brazil